Fazeelat Aslam is a Pakistani documentary filmmaker and journalist based in New York City. She is also co-producer of the Academy Award-winning documentary Saving Face.

Early life and career
Fazeelat was born in Lahore, Pakistan.  Later her family moved to Zambia and then to Karachi. She attended high school in London and graduated from Wellesley College in the United States, where she double majored in Media Studies and Gender Studies.
Fazeelat returned to Pakistan and started a career as a news anchor at National News prior to joining Dawn News. Shortly after, she left the company to create documentaries. Fazeelat has produced documentaries for international organizations including PBS Frontline, Channel 4 UK and HBO. She worked as a producer and correspondent for the second season of Vice documentary on HBO. Fazeelat went to the brick kilns to investigate the conditions of modern slavery, where she interviewed a female bonded labourer for the 'Episode 2 Extended: Forced Slavery Interview', that covered the humanitarian work of Syeda Ghulam Fatima. In 2012 Fazeelat made an appearance in a video of the song ‘Awaam’, by rapper Faris Shafi.

Awards
2012 Academy Award for Best Documentary Short Subject  Saving Face
2014 Emmy Award for Outstanding Informational Series

References

External links
 Official site
 

Pakistani documentary filmmakers
Pakistani women journalists
Pakistani emigrants to the United States
Wellesley College alumni
Pakistani expatriates in Zambia
Women documentary filmmakers